The 2007 Illinois Fighting Illini football team represented the University of Illinois in the 2007 NCAA Division I FBS football season.  The team's head coach was Ron Zook. The Illini played their home games at Memorial Stadium in Champaign, Illinois.  Illinois entered the season in search of improvement upon a 2–10 record in 2006, and secured bowl-eligibility the first time since 2001 with a homecoming win over Ball State. From weeks 2–6, the Illini won five straight games, their longest win streak since 2001.  On November 10, the Fighting Illini upset the then #1 ranked Ohio State Buckeyes at Ohio Stadium in Columbus, Ohio.

Schedule

Rankings

Game summaries

Missouri

The Illini scored first off a Vontae Davis blocked-punt return. Quarterback Juice Williams looked sharp in the first quarter before leaving due to injury in the second. Mizzou jumped out to a 37–13 lead late in the third quarter, before backup quarterback Eddie McGee led the Illini to 21 straight points. A late fourth-quarter interception sealed the game for the Tigers. McGee ended the day 17–31 for 257 yards with a TD, but lost 2 fumbles and threw 2 interceptions. The loss increased Illinois' losing streak to 8 games.

Western Illinois

The Illini returned to Memorial Stadium to face FCS Western Illinois in the home opener. Illinois built upon a 7–0 halftime lead with a Juice Williams touchdown run in the third quarter and a Rashard Mendenhall touchdown run in the fourth. Mendenhall finished the day with 142 yards.

Syracuse

Illinois looked to secure its first road win at the Carrier Dome. After one quarter, the Illini led 14–0 off a Juice Williams touchdown pass and a Rashard Mendenhall touchdown run. Syracuse got on the board in the third quarter with a field goal, and eventually cut the deficit to 20–10. But big plays hurt the Orange in the second half. Arrelious Benn ran for 23 yards on one play, and one drive later, Rashard Mendenhall ran for 50. He finished the day with 150 rush yards and 3 TD's. 378 of Illinois' total yards came on the ground, and they outgained Syracuse 508–286 overall.

Indiana

Illinois opened their Big Ten season at Indiana. Two Jason Reda field goals put the Illini on the board before Juice Williams found Michael Hoomanawanui in the endzone. They led 20–7 at the half. After a Rashard Mendenhall touchdown put Illinois up 27–7 in the fourth quarter, Indiana QB Kellen Lewis drove down the field to find James Bailey for a 30-yd touchdown, Lewis' second TD on the day. But with a minute left, Vontae Davis picked off Lewis in the endzone, securing a 27–14 Illinois victory, their first in a Big Ten opener since 1993 and their first in Bloomington since 2001. Mendenhall finished the day with a career-high 214 rush yards. Tracy Porter picked off two Juice Williams passes, and Williams finished a disappointing passing effort 13–28 with a TD.

Penn State

The Illini faced ranked opposition for the first time in 2007 when the #19 Nittany Lions came to Memorial Stadium. Penn State scored first with a field goal, but Arrelious Benn returned the ensuing kick-off 90 yards for a touchdown, putting Illinois up 7–3. They did not relinquish the lead. Their defense intercepted Penn State quarterback Anthony Morelli 3 times, and allowed the Nittany Lions to score only 3 times out of 6 red zone possessions. A Kevin Mitchell interception with 9 seconds on the clock ended Penn State's comeback hopes. Illinois' victory marked their first over a ranked opponent since the 2001 season and gives the Illini a 4-game win streak, also their longest since 2001.

Wisconsin

Going into the game, the unranked Fighting Illini were actually favored by oddsmakers to beat the #5 Badgers, who entered the game undefeated but having had numerous close games against unranked opponents, including a close game against The Citadel. The Illini won in a game not as close as the score.

Iowa

The #18 Fighting Illini suffered their first Big Ten loss of the season at Kinnick Stadium. In the fourth quarter, trailing 10–6, Eddie McGee appeared to complete an 82-yard pass for a touchdown, but an ineligible receiver downfield penalty negated the would-be go-ahead score. With two minutes left, Eddie McGee drove the Illini to the Iowa 11-yard line, but threw an interception to seal the win for the Hawkeyes.

Michigan

illinois fumbled a punt late in the fourth quarter and ultimately lost the game

Ball State

Minnesota

Ohio State

With their win over the Buckeyes, the Illini defeated a No. 1 ranked team for the first time since 1956, and for the first time ever on the road. Juice Williams completed 12 out of 22 passes for only 140 yards, but four receptions were caught for touchdowns. With the win, the Illini damaged the Buckeyes' national title hopes, though Ohio State eventually reached the national championship game due to insufficient winning by other teams. The Illibuck was returned to Champaign in 2008. This was arguably one of the greatest victories in the history of Illinois football. As of 2018, this is the last time Illinois has beaten Ohio State, as the Buckeyes have won the last 9 games in the series, including the last 4 in Columbus.

Northwestern

Coming off the Ohio State upset, the Illini faced the Northwestern Wildcats. After jumping out to a 14-0 lead, the Illini played redshirt freshmen for the remainder of the game cruising to a 44-22 victory.

Rose Bowl

The Illini ended the 2007 season by participating in the 2008 Rose Bowl, held on New Year's Day in the Rose Bowl stadium in Pasadena, California.  Although it traditionally hosts the champions of the Big Ten and Pac-10 conferences, the 2007 Big Ten Champion, Ohio State, was ranked #1 in the final BCS poll and instead participated in the 2008 BCS National Championship Game.  The rules governing BCS bowl selections allowed the Rose Bowl to select a BCS "at-large" team from the top fourteen teams ranked in the BCS Standings that have at least nine wins.  Keeping with its traditional bowl ties, the Rose Bowl selected #13-ranked Illinois Fighting Illini (9–3), under third-year head coach Ron Zook.

The Illini entered the Rose Bowl after a Cinderella season where they won nine games, including an upset victory over at-the-time #1 Ohio State, after winning a total of four games the previous two seasons.  It was Illinois' first bowl game since winning the 2001 Big Ten Championship and playing in the 2002 Sugar Bowl.  The Illini offense was led by sophomore quarterback "Juice" Williams, who in the regular season passed for 13 touchdowns and ran for seven, junior running back Rashard Mendenhall, who averaged 127 yards rushing per game and scored 18 touchdowns, and freshman receiver Arrelious Benn, who caught 49 passes and had  158 yards in 32 carries.  For taking Illinois to the Rose Bowl a year after going 2–10, Zook won both national and Big Ten coach of the year honors.  The Illini entered the game 13.5-point underdogs, the biggest of any of the season's 32 bowl games.

The Trojans defeated the Illini 49–17 before a sold out Rose Bowl crowd.

Roster

Awards and honors
 Rashard Mendenhall (Running back)
Chicago Tribune Silver Football
All-American, (running back)
Martin O'Donnell (Offensive Guard)
All-American, (offensive guard)
Jeremy Leman, (Linebacker)
All-American, (linebacker)

References

Illinois
Illinois Fighting Illini football seasons
Illinois Fighting Illini football